Wainikoroiluva River is a river of Viti Levu, Fiji.

See also
List of rivers of Fiji

References
GEOnet Names Server

Rivers of Viti Levu